Everton Bunsie (born 18 April 1977) is a Jamaican football midfielder who currently plays for Arnett Gardens F.C.

Club career
Bunsie was one of the locally famous 'Gang of Five', the others being Kevin Wilson, Cornel Chin-Sue, Kwame Richardson and Eugene Barnes.

International career
Bunsie made 4 appearances for Jamaica national football team.

References

1977 births
Living people
Jamaican footballers
Jamaica international footballers
Arnett Gardens F.C. players
Association football midfielders